Dámaso Torres (born 11 December 1945) is a Spanish racing cyclist. He rode in the 1973 Tour de France.

References

External links
 

1945 births
Living people
Spanish male cyclists
Place of birth missing (living people)
Sportspeople from the Province of Málaga
Cyclists from Andalusia